Stephanie A. Romanov (born January 24, 1969) is an American model and actress, best known for playing Lilah Morgan on Angel.

Life and career
Romanov was born in Las Vegas, Nevada. She first began modeling in Europe and was discovered at 15 by Elite Model Management founder, John Casablancas. Her first professional modeling job was in Europe, shooting fashion layouts for Italian and French Bazaar. She then moved to New York to pursue a professional model career, leaving her family in Las Vegas. She appeared in ELLE, Vanity Fair and French Vogue.

In 1993, Romanov decided to leave modeling in favour of acting. She landed her first role as Teri Spencer on Aaron Spelling's Models, Inc.. She went on to land guest starring roles in Homicide: Life on the Street, The Sentinel, Just Shoot Me! and Burke's Law. She starred on Angel for four seasons, playing Lilah Morgan from 2000–2003.

Romanov has also appeared in several films, including Spy Hard and Menno's Mind. She played Jacqueline Kennedy in the critically acclaimed Thirteen Days and appeared in The Final Cut alongside Robin Williams.

She is of Russian descent. In December 2001, she married film producer Nick Wechsler in Cambodia; they have one child together, Lily Andreja Romanov-Wechsler.

Filmography

Slumber Party Slaughter (2012 film) - as Victoria SpencerLast Night (2010) - as SandraThe Final Cut (2004) - as Jennifer BannisterTricks (2004) - as CandyIt Is What It Is (2001)Thirteen Days (2000) - as Jacqueline KennedySunset Strip (2000) - as ChristineAngel (2000–2003) (recurring) as Lilah MorganDark Spiral (1999) as SoupieSeven Days (TV series) Episodes: Sister's Keeper (1999) and Kansas (2001) - as Svetlana VukovitchAlexandria Hotel (1998)Due South Episode: Odds (1998) - as Denny "Lady Shoes" ScarpaCadillac (1997) as KathyEarly Edition (TV series) Episode: Redfellas (1997) - as Paulina RosanovaJust Shoot Me! Episode: La Cage (1997) - as Nikki EllstonThe Sentinel Episode: The Inside Man (1997) - as Michelle LazarMenno's Mind (1996) - as LoriaSpy Hard (1996) as Victoria/Barbara DahlHomicide: Life on the Street (TV series) Episode: Fire, Part 1 and 2 (1995) - as Anne KennedyBurke's Law (TV series) Episode: Who Killed the Tennis Ace? (1995) - as Liza DeanModels Inc. (TV series) (1994–1995) - as Teri Spencer, and Monique DuranMelrose Place'' (TV series) (1994) - as Teri Spencer (two episodes)

References

External links

1969 births
Female models from Nevada
American film actresses
American television actresses
American people of Russian descent
Living people
Actresses from Las Vegas
20th-century American actresses
21st-century American actresses